Tor Åge Bringsværd (born 16 November 1939 in Skien, Norway) is an author, playwright, editor and translator. He is perhaps best known for his speculative fiction. Together with long-time partner Jon Bing, he is also considered as the first Norwegian author to write science fiction literature. Bringsværd regards himself as an anarchist, which is clearly reflected in some of his works. He is also known for his distinctive style of writing, for example for his seemingly random jumps to narratives or anecdotes with no clear relationship to the main story.

Bibliography

Novels

Bazar, 1970
Den som har begge beina på jorda står stille,1974
Syvsoverskens dystre frokost, 1976
Pinocchio-papirene, 1978
Minotauros, 1980
Ker Shus, 1983
Gobi. Barndommens måne, 1985
Gobi. Djengis Khan, 1987
Uten tittel, 1988
Gobi. Djevelens skinn og ben, 1989
Gobi. Min prins, 1994
Den enøyde, 1996
Gobi. Baghdad, 1997
Pudder? Pudder! eller: Sleeping Beauty in the Valley of the Wild, Wild Pigs, 2001
Web. Betroelser om en truet art, 2005
Kvinnen som var et helt bord alene, 2009
Slipp håndtaket når du vrir, 2011
Ikke fordi den har et svar, men fordi den har en sang, 2013

Children's Books

 Tambar er et troll 2015

Prizes and recognition
1985 – The Norwegian Critics Prize for Literature for the novel Gobi – barndommens måne (Gyldendal Norsk Forlag, Oslo)
1994 – Riksmål Society Literature Prize
2000 – Ibsen Prize
2008 – Alf Prøysen's Prize of Honor
2009 – The honorary Brage Prize, an open special award
2010 – Norsk kulturråds ærespris (Arts Council of Norway Honorary Award)

References

1939 births
Living people
20th-century Norwegian novelists
Anarchist writers
Dobloug Prize winners
Norwegian anarchists
Norwegian Critics Prize for Literature winners
Norwegian dramatists and playwrights
Norwegian science fiction writers
People from Skien